Jouni Antero Vainio (born 13 October 1960 in Mäntsälä) is a Finnish former sport shooter who competed in the 1988 Summer Olympics.

References

1960 births
Living people
Finnish male sport shooters
ISSF pistol shooters
Olympic shooters of Finland
Shooters at the 1988 Summer Olympics